Blue Angel may refer to:

Music
Blue Angel (band), which featured Cyndi Lauper as their lead vocalist, prior to her solo career
Blue Angel (Blue Angel album), 1980
Blue Angel (Patricia Conroy album), 1990
Blue Angel (Strawbs album), 2003
Blue Angel,  a 1998 album by Park Ji Yoon

Songs
 "Blue Angel" (song), Roy Orbison, 1960
 "Blue Angel", a single by Gene Pitney written by Roger Cook, 1974 No.2 in Australia
 "Blue Angel", a song by Squirrel Nut Zippers from their 1996 album Hot
 "Blue Angel", a song by Dave Cousins from his 1972 album Two Weeks Last Summer
 "Blue Angel", a song by The Love Language from their 2010 album Libraries

Films
 The Blue Angel, a 1930 movie starring Marlene Dietrich and Emil Jannings
 The Blue Angel (1959 film), a remake, starring May Britt and Curt Jurgens

Literature
 The Blue Angel (novel), a 1999 novel based on the science fiction TV series Doctor Who
 Blue Angel (novel), a 2000 novel by American author Francine Prose
The Blue Angel, the English title of the novel Professor Unrat
Blue Is the Warmest Color (comics), a 2010 graphic novel by French author Julie Maroh originally titled Blue Angel

Other
Blue Angel (train), a diesel railcar formerly used by the Netherlands Railways
 Blue Angel (certification), a German certification for environmentally friendly products and services
Blue Angel (nightclub), a nightclub in Liverpool, England
The Blue Angel (New York nightclub), a defunct nightclub in New York City
Blue Angel, the act of fart lighting
HTC Blue Angel, a mobile phone made by High Tech Computer Corporation
The blue angel, Glaucus atlanticus, a species of sea slugs

See also
 Blue Angels (disambiguation)